Called Back is a 1933 British crime film directed by Reginald Denham and Jack Harris and starring Franklin Dyall, Lester Matthews and Dorothy Boyd. It was a quota quickie made at Twickenham Studios.

Cast
 Franklin Dyall as Dr. Jose Manuel  
 Lester Matthews as Gilbert Vaughan  
 Dorothy Boyd as Pauline March  
 Alexander Sarner as Santos Macari  
 Anthony Ireland as Anthony March  
 Francis L. Sullivan as Kaledin  
 Ian Fleming as Dr. Carter  
 Margaret Emden as Priscilla  
 Geoffrey Goodheart as Ivan

References

Bibliography
 Low, Rachael. Filmmaking in 1930s Britain. George Allen & Unwin, 1985.
 Wood, Linda. British Films, 1927-1939. British Film Institute, 1986.

External links

1933 films
British crime films
1933 crime films
Films directed by Reginald Denham
Films shot at Twickenham Film Studios
Quota quickies
British black-and-white films
1930s English-language films
1930s British films